"Blue-green" mealybugs are a group of related mealybug genera whose insides, during adulthood, are usually of the color which gives them their collective name. Alternately, this group may be referred to as blue-black mealybugs. It includes the genera Amonostherium, Australicoccus, Melanococus, and Nipaecoccus.

While the exact relationships between various scale insects are often contested, one suggestion is to class all (and only) the blue-green mealybugs in the sub-family Trabutininae.

References

Bibliography
 
 
 
 

Agricultural pest insects
Insect common names
Insect pests of ornamental plants
Insect vectors of plant pathogens
Pseudococcidae